This is the discography of American rapper King T.

Albums

Studio albums

Compilation albums
Having a "T" Party with Ice-T (1991)
Ruff Rhymes: Greatest Hits Collection (1998)
The Ruthless Chronicles (2004)

Mixtapes
 San Andreas: The Original Mixtape w/ Young Maylay (2005)(Producer, featured artist)
Boss Up, Volume 1 (2006)
Tha Triflin' Mixtape (2012)

Singles
 1986: "Payback's a Mutha"
 1987: "The Coolest"
 1988: "Bass"
 1989: "Act a Fool"
 1990: "Ruff Rhyme (Back Again)"
 1990: "At Your Own Risk"
 1990: "Diss You"
 1990: "Played Like a Piano" w/ Ice Cube and Breeze
 1992: "Got It Bad Y'all"
 1992: "Bust Dat Ass"
 1993: "Black Togetha Again"
 1994: "Dippin'"
 1995: "Way Out There"
 1995: "Free Style Ghetto" w/ Xzibit, Tha Alkaholiks and MC Breeze
 1998: "Got It Lock'd" (from original 1998 Aftermath-planned release of Thy Kingdom Come
 2001: "Back Up" w/ Phil Da Agony
 2003: "Get Ready 2 Ride" w/ Battle Cat
 2003: "Stop on By" w/ Tray Dee
 2012: "Still In Business" w/ Xzibit, Butch Cassidy and Silky Slim

Guest appearances

References

Hip hop discographies
Discographies of American artists